John Bunting (c. 1480–1544/46), of New Romney, Kent, was an English politician.

He was a Member of Parliament (MP) for New Romney in 1529 and 1536. He was also chamberlain and jurat in New Romney, and bailiff to Yarmouth. His son was Richard Bunting.

References

1480 births
1540s deaths
Members of Parliament for New Romney
Bailiffs
Chamberlains
Jurats
English MPs 1529–1536
English MPs 1536